Robert MacFarlan Cole (December 26, 1889 – January 18, 1986) was an American chemical engineer, inventor, and author. He helped develop many chemicals, including freon and its use as a refrigerant and an aerosol repellent, a substance to counteract poisonous gas in World War I, synthetic rubber and pyrethrin insecticides in World War II, and ethylene oxide as a hospital germicide.

Biography
His education included studies at the Armour Institute (now part of Illinois Institute of Technology), the University of Illinois and the University of Chicago, where he received his doctorate in chemistry.

He married, on October 26, 1918, Wertha Pendleton, the daughter of William Frederic Pendleton, the founding bishop of the General Church of the New Jerusalem (Swedenborgian Faith). Their children included: William P. Cole, Dandridge M. Cole, Aubrey Cole Odhner, and the Rev. Robert H. P. Cole.

He became the founder and first president of Hord Color Products in Sandusky, Ohio in 1920. There he helped pioneer color processes and products. In 1928, Mr. Cole went to work for the American Dyewood Co. in Chester, Pa., where he developed recycling of the paper in telephone directories.

Cole reported to the E. I. du Pont de Nemours and Company that he had witnessed chlorofluorocarbon, considered a poisonous gas, being used safely in Germany. A duPont chemist, William Warren Rhodes, and Mr. Cole worked on the development of the gas, to which duPont gave the trade name Freon. "I was there when the first seven cc's of Freon came out of the distilling apparatus in Sandusky, Ohio" He told a Pennsylvania newspaper.

During World War II, Mr. Cole was a member of the War Chemical Board and pioneered the artificial synthesis of pyrethrin, used as an insecticide by the U.S. Navy in the South Pacific. He died on January 18, 1986.

Bibliography
Stieglitz Theory of Color Production Chicago, 1937.

References 

American chemical engineers
American science writers
Illinois Institute of Technology alumni
1889 births
1986 deaths